The Palace of Serbia is a building located in the Novi Beograd municipality of Belgrade, Serbia. The building is used by the government of Serbia and currently houses several cabinet level ministries and agencies.

Name 
The technical name of the building is Federal Executive Council 1 (abbr. SIV 1) as it was used by the Federal Executive Council of Yugoslavia. Later, it was informally known as the Palace of the Federation before given its present name.

After the construction was finished, the building was named "The Palace of the Federation", but colloquially and sometimes even officially it referred to as SIV and SIV 1 (after the construction of the buildings SIV 2 and SIV 3). After the disintegration of the Socialist Federal Republic of Yugoslavia, only the name "Palace of Federation" was used, and after the secession of Montenegro in 2006, the building got its unofficial name "Palace of Serbia", although it has never been officially renamed.

Location 
The building is located in the neighborhood of Ušće, and belongs to the "Block 13" in the New Belgrade's block numeration system. It stretches between two boulevards named after the scientist, of Mihajlo Pupin on the south, and of Nikola Tesla, on the north. On the west and east it is surrounded by the Ušće park.

History 
Architectural design competition for the new building of the Presidency of Yugoslavia was announced in 1946. The accepted project from the group of architects from Zagreb included the exterior 'H' shape designed by lead architect Vladimir Potočnjak and his team: Anton Urlih, Zlatko Nojman and Dragica Perak. Construction officially began in the summer of 1948 but was halted only a year later. By that time, only the "skeletons" of the side wings and part of the central annex were finished.

The Palace was initially conceived as the part of the public ensemble of public buildings, but such programme was reduced by the adoption of the General Urban Plan of the City of Belgrade in 1950, according to which the Palace, along with the hotel “Yugoslavia”, remained secluded on the right bank of the Danube. Other projected objects next to it included the Museum of the Revolution, in the section between the building and the modern Ušće Tower, and the building of the Radio Television Belgrade, in the section to the modern Bulevar umetnosti. The idea was scrapped but in 2017 it was announced the foundations of the proposed museum, constructed in 1978, will be used for the future building of the Belgrade Philharmonic Orchestra.  The construction progressed until Potočnjak's death in 1952. The project was taken over by Mihailo Janković who designed the interior of the structure and oversaw its construction from the resumed works in 1955 until completion in 1959. It was built by the "Rad" construction company.

With the decision to continue the construction, finishing the project was entrusted to the Belgrade architect Mihailo Janković, and to the architectural design office “Stadion”, under which supervision the building was realized in the period from 1955 to 1961. On that covered and sandy soil, the building was constructed by the Youth work brigades from all around Yugoslavia. Janković significantly changed the original design by adding some new elements and not leaving much of the original project, except for the overal H shape. The central annex on the river side was demolished and instead of one main entrance, two were projected, with the ceremonial one being the one in the modern Bulevar Mihajla Pupina. The design by an architect Janković and his team also brought in significant changes in interior organization. He kept the urban disposition, basic measures and mutual relations of certain tracts from the original design, whereas the main changes concerned the interior spatial organization. According to the altered design, the central part with the Banquet Hall, all the annexes around the building as well as the façade were constructed. By shifting the main entrance to the southern side, the entire building got accentuated orientation towards the future settlement. Along with the representative hall placed on the first floor of the newly designed annex, a number of extra lounges, conference halls, twenty-eight cabinets for the members of the Federal Executive Council, about sixty offices for the administration, as well as the following space for garaging vehicles were anticipated by the new programme of the interior design.

The original plans were designed according to the Socialist realism aesthetics, as Yugoslavia at that time was an ally of the Soviet Union. However, after the Tito–Stalin split in 1948, many things in the state changed, so the new project by Janković was Modernistic instead.

Proposed projects 

A 1959 plan envisioned urban axis SIV Building-Belgrade Main railway station (in Savamala) as the baseline for the future development of both old and new parts of Belgrade. The area between these two points, described as "two basal foundations", was to be spanned with nine urban blocks, spreading on both sides of the Sava. However, disliked by the group of influential architects, in the future development the envisioned urban tissue was effectively "cut" by the new projects, and almost nothing of the planned has done.

Architecture 
The building was constructed in the mixed stripped down classicist (the main structure) and modernist (the glass domed great hall with front entrance) architectural styles. Common misconception about it being in socialist realism/Stalinist style is due to lack of such buildings in Belgrade in general. Due to Tito - Stalin split occurring before major new construction began in the city, the style, with the exception of Trade Unions Building, never took hold in Yugoslavia. While it is the most monumental building of the early socialist period, unfamiliar with Soviet construction of the time, yet familiar with the term used for it, come to this obviously erroneous conclusion. Its H-shaped base covers an area of approximately 65,000 m², thus making it the largest building in Serbia by area covered. It has 744 offices, about 30 m² each, 13 conference rooms, six salons, three large halls and two garages.

The representative exterior matches the luxuriously designed interior, also realized according to the architect Mihailo Janković's design, which places this building among the pioneer examples of the „total design“ in domestic architecture. The unique interior design, with numerous works of Fine and Applied Arts, which make the integral part of the building, gives the Palace the character of some kind of a gallery of Yugoslav 20th century art. The interior, as well as the exterior design was supposed to reflect the power, the greatness, the stability and the integrity of new Yugoslavia. The interior decoration design included artistic decoration of the walls with the mosaic technique, graffiti and fresco-painting, as well as by placing free-standing sculptures and reliefs, which was the specific assignment given to the special artistic commission. The design of the lounges dedicated to all six of the federal republics of the former Socialist Federal Republic of Yugoslavia, located in the central part of the palace, was based on the accentuation of the traditional motifs, characteristic for every federal unit of the country. The Yugoslav lounge represented the largest and at the same time the most representative room in the palace. The peculiar design of this lounge was seen in the monumental frescoes by Petar Lubarda, and Lazar Vujaklija, as well as the triptych-mosaic The Creation of Yugoslavia, the work of Mladen Srbinović. The solemn character of this room was particularly emphasized by the crystal chandelier hanging from the dome, with more than two thousand five hundred light bulbs, and the weight of nine tons.

The works of Yugoslav's Fine and Applied Arts characterize the interior design of the Palace. Among them, the ones which particularly stand out for their artistic, cultural and historical importance are the works of the following authors: Petar Lubarda, Antun Augustinčić, Frano Kršinić, Matija Vuković, Ante Gržetić, Sava Sandić, Vincent Beneš, Boža Ilić, Đorđe Andrejević Kun, Predrag- Peđa Milosavljević, Stojan Aralica, Bora Baruh, Lazar Ličenoski, Branislav Nemet, Vera Čohadžić, France Slana, Milivoj Uzelac, Ferdo Majer, Lazar Vujaklija, Mladen Srbinović, Matija Rodiči, Branko Subotić-Sube, Jože Ciuha, Lazar Vozarević, Janez Bernik, Vojo Dimitrijević, Drago Tihec, Milan Konjović, Ivan Radović, Marinko Benzon, Boško Petrović, Ratomir Stojadinović, Dragi Trajanovski, Jovan Bijelić, Zora Petrović, Olivera Kangrga, Vojin Bakić, Ignjat Job, Boško Petrović, Olivera Petrović, Olivera Galović, Milica Zorić, Lazar Vozarević, Oton Gliha, Jagoda Bujić, Vida Jocić, Milo Milunović, Sreten Stojanović, Risto Stijović, Mira Sandić, Nebiojša Mitrić, Andrej Jemec, Drago Tršar, Branko Filipović-Filo, Drago Ordev, Slavko Atanasovski Krstanče, Bogosav Živković, Tone Kralj, Ferdo Majer, Ratomir Gligorijević, Jovan Rakidžić, Stevan Dukić, Marin Pregelj, Drinka Radovanović.

The building was designed in the shape of the letter “H” and covers the base area of 5,500m². In front of the medium wing there is a lower area covered with the glass dome where the Congress Hall is placed, with the capacity of 2,000 invitees. The building contains six lounges, as well as about one thousand offices.

The building was constructed according to the system of the reinforced concrete skeleton structure, filled with bricks. The façade of the building is covered with the white Brač marble, whereas the openings were made of white metal. Startingfrom 1961, when the First Conference of the Non-aligned countries was held, the Palace of the Federation received many foreign statesmen and delegations. The first session of the Federal Executive Council in the new building was held no later than 29 April 1961.

With its architectural values, the Palace of the Federal Executive Council marked the period of creating the recognizable image of Novi Beograd and Belgrade in general. It is one of the most distinctive landmarks of Novi Beograd and its firm urban hierarchy. The aesthetic and visual values of the building are emphasized with the special park design of the surrounding, with the accesses, parking lot, garages and the fountain, as well as with the general position of the building, which enables its incessant overview. Within the design of the immediate surroundings of the palace, and for the purpose of the visiting of the members of high delegations, the construction of the Park of Friendship was started, as one of the most specific green areas in the entire world.

The Palace of the Federal Executive Council, along with the works of Fine and Applied Arts, which constitute its integral part, was designated the cultural monument in 2013.

References

External links

Buildings and structures in Belgrade
Government buildings in Serbia
New Belgrade
Palaces in Serbia